WOZK (900 AM) is a radio station licensed to serve Ozark, Alabama, United States.  The station, which began broadcasting in 1953, is owned by Fred Dockins, through licensee Dockins Communications, Inc.

References

External links

OZK
Radio stations established in 1953